Akshar Deep Inter College is an educational institute located in the village of Vaina, Uttar Pradesh, India. It was established  by V.N. Shiksha Samiti to upgrade the life of the community. It is situated on Jewar Road and very well-connected to villages like Manpur, Rasulpur, Budhaka, Atari, Alawalpur, Mangrauli and Chauroli.

This school is providing quality education and focusing on overall development of students. The main features of college includes hygienic sanitation, well equipped classes, qualified teachers with different skill-sets. The management is aggressively focusing on 100% attendance, Parents Teachers Discussions, Regular Feedback System, Regular competitive class tests and special classes by guest faculties. 

The school is continuously improving the level of education not only to the students enrolled but to those who are not enrolled by creating a healthy and competitive environment among the schools of the area. Akshar Deep organizes multiple General Knowledge competition for the students of the area. 

Intermediate colleges in Uttar Pradesh
Education in Aligarh district